Reiss Luke Nelson (born 10 December 1999) is an English professional footballer who plays as a winger for Premier League club Arsenal.

Early and personal life
Nelson was born in Elephant and Castle, London He grew up in Aylesbury Estate in Walworth and attended the London Nautical School. He became friends with fellow aspiring footballer Jadon Sancho, who lived nearby, after they played together in youth tournaments.

Club career

Arsenal
Nelson joined the Arsenal academy when he was nine years old and made a great impression on youth coaches, regularly being moved up to squads above his age group. He played 35 games for the Arsenal youth teams, including nine games in the U-21 team, in the 2016–17 campaign. Following several impressive performances in the youth teams, he signed his first professional contract with Arsenal on 10 December 2016, his 17th birthday. Arsène Wenger included Nelson in the squad for 2017–18 pre-season tour.

2017–20: First-team debut and FA Cup win
On 19 July 2017, Nelson made his first senior appearance against Bayern Munich in a 2017 International Champions Cup pre-season match. He made his first competitive appearance for Arsenal's first team in the Community Shield, coming on as a substitute against Chelsea – Arsenal went on to win 4–1 on penalties.

On 14 September 2017, Nelson made his European debut as he came on as a substitute for Theo Walcott at the 82nd-minute mark in the Europa League match against FC Köln. He made his first start for the club against Doncaster Rovers in the League Cup on 20 September 2017. Reiss had an impressive season with the Arsenal U23 squad, scoring 9 goals, assisting 3 in 11 appearances as Arsenal won the 2017–18 PL2.

On 20 January 2018, Nelson made his Premier League debut in a 4–1 win against Crystal Palace, coming on as a substitute in the 72nd minute. On 8 April 2018, he made his first Premier League start in a 3–2 win over Southampton, being substituted off in the 64th minute for Jack Wilshere. On 17 May 2018, Nelson was awarded the PL2 Player of the Year.

After a successful season on loan, Nelson returned to Arsenal ahead of the 2019–20 Premier League season. He was promoted to the first team by manager Unai Emery and given the number 24. Nelson was handed his first two starts of the season in Arsenal's opening games against Newcastle United and Burnley. On 24 September 2019, Nelson started and played the full 90-minute of Arsenal's 5–0 EFL Cup victory against Nottingham Forest. He scored his debut goal for the first team, adding a fourth for Arsenal in the 84th minute. He was out with a knee injury during the months of October and November. He made his return on 9 December, coming off the bench for a short cameo in a 3–1 win over Southampton. Nelson scored his second goal of the season on 6 January, in Arsenal's 1–0 home win over Leeds United in the FA Cup. Nelson suffered a hamstring strain in mid-January, making his return off the bench on 7 March, in a 1–0 win over West Ham United.

After the three-month suspension of the Premier League due to the COVID-19 pandemic, Nelson often was Mikel Arteta's favoured attacking substitute. On 15 July 2020, Nelson scored his first Premier League goal, starting in a 2–1 win against Liverpool. Nelson was in the squad as Arsenal won their 14th FA Cup against Chelsea on 1 August 2020. On 29 August 2020, Nelson came on as a substitute, taking and scoring the first penalty in a shootout win against Liverpool in the Community Shield after the game ended 1–1.

2018–19: Loan to 1899 Hoffenheim

On 31 August 2018, Nelson signed a long-term contract with Arsenal, then went on season-long loan at German club 1899 Hoffenheim for a loan fee of €500,000. On 15 September 2018, he made his debut as a 72nd-minute substitute away to Fortuna Düsseldorf, and within 14 minutes of entering the field of play, Nelson scored for Hoffenheim, scoring a consolation goal for the club in a 2–1 loss. Reiss had an impressive season for Hoffenheim, scoring 7 goals in just 587 minutes of action at such a young age.

Hoffenheim's coach Julian Nagelsmann orchestrated the move for Nelson, calling him "...an incredible player in one-on-one situations". He also hailed Nelson's talent, claiming "he had the abilities to reach the levels of elite players in football such as Lionel Messi, Cristiano Ronaldo [and] Arjen Robben [if] he maintained his consistency and mentality".

2021–22: Loan to Feyenoord
On 31 August 2021, Nelson moved on loan to the Netherlands to join Eredivisie side Feyenoord for the 2021–22 season. Nelson got his first assist during injury time for the club on 7 November 2021 against AZ Alkmaar after coming on as a substitute.

2022–23: Return to Arsenal 
On 30 October 2022, he scored a brace and registered an assist in his first Premier League match of the season in a 5–0 win over Nottingham Forest after coming on as a substitute for Bukayo Saka.
He came on as a substitute in the 69th minute against Bournemouth on 4 March 2023, and assisted Ben White's 70th minute equalizer before scoring Arsenal's winner with the last kick of the game as the Gunners came back from 2–0 down to win 3–2 and regained their five-point lead at the top of the Premier League over chasers Manchester City on matchday 26.

International career
Nelson has played for England youth teams, at all levels from under-16 to under-21.

In May 2016, Nelson was part of the England national under-17 football team that reached the quarter-finals of the 2016 UEFA European Under-17 Championship, playing four games and scoring three goals. His performances during the competition led to his inclusion in the team of the tournament.

In March 2018, Nelson scored twice for England under-19 against Hungary in a qualifier for the 2018 UEFA European Under-19 Championship. He was one of a number of players withdrawn from selection for the tournament by their club.

On 11 October 2018, Nelson made his U21 debut against Andorra, coming on as a second-half substitute; he scored the Young Lions sixth goal with a backheel in stoppage time in a 7–0 victory that secured qualification for the 2019 UEFA European Under-21 Championship.

Although also eligible for Zimbabwe, Nelson specified in 2018 that he aimed to play for England in the long term, saying that playing for England would be "a dream come true".

On 27 May 2019, Nelson was included in England's 23-man squad for the 2019 UEFA European Under-21 Championship and scored from the penalty spot in his only appearance; a 3–3 draw with Croatia at the San Marino Stadium on 24 June 2019.

Career statistics

HonoursArsenalFA Cup: 2019–20
FA Community Shield: 2017, 2020Feyenoord UEFA Europa Conference League runner-up: 2021–22Individual'
UEFA European Under-17 Championship Team of the Tournament: 2016
Bundesliga Rookie of the Month: October 2018

References

External links

Profile at the Arsenal F.C. website
Profile at the Football Association website

1999 births
Living people
People from Elephant and Castle
Footballers from the London Borough of Southwark
English footballers
England youth international footballers
England under-21 international footballers
Association football midfielders
Arsenal F.C. players
TSG 1899 Hoffenheim players
Feyenoord players
Premier League players
Bundesliga players
Eredivisie players
English expatriate footballers
Expatriate footballers in Germany
Expatriate footballers in the Netherlands
English expatriate sportspeople in Germany
English expatriate sportspeople in the Netherlands
Black British sportsmen
English people of Zimbabwean descent